Khuean Srinagarindra National Park ("Srinagarind Dam National Park") is a national park in Kanchanaburi Province, Thailand. The park, centred on the Srinagarind Reservoir, is part of the Western Forest Complex protected area.

Geography
The park's area is 957,500 rai ~ . At the heart of the park is the Srinagarind Reservoir, a reservoir created by the damming of the Khwae Yai river by the Srinagarind Dam.

History
The park's caves, particularly Tham Phra Prang, were used by Thai soldiers as a hiding place during the Thai – Burmese wars of the 18th century.

Srinagarind Reservoir formed on completion of the Srinagarind Dam in 1980. On 23 December 1981, Khuean Srinagarindra was designated a national park.

Attractions
Khuean Srinagarindra's most popular attraction is Huay Mae Khamin waterfall, a waterfall of seven levels which eventually flows to the Khwae Yai River. The waterfall's source is in the mountains in the east of the park. Other park waterfalls include Pha Sawan and Pha Tat.

The park contains numerous cave systems. Tham Neramit is dome-like in appearance and features stalactites and stalagmites. Tham Phra Prang, also featuring stalactites and stalagmites, hosts a Buddha image inside. Other caves include Tham Nam Mut and Tham Phra Kho.

Flora and fauna

The park's mountain forests are evergreen and deciduous. Tree species include Hopea ferrea, Pterocarpus macrocarpus, Afzelia xylocarpa, Dalbergia oliveri, Shorea obtusa, Xylia xylocarpa, Shorea siamensis, Schleichera oleosa, Lagerstroemia calyculata and Tetrameles nudiflora.
Park animals include Asian elephant, tiger, gaur, lar gibbon, Phayre's leaf monkey and sambar. Bird life features species such as olive-backed sunbird, Oriental pied hornbill, red junglefowl, scaly-breasted munia, scarlet-backed flowerpecker and thick-billed green pigeon. Freshwater fish species in the park include giant snakehead, ocellated featherback (Chitala ornata), greater brook carp (Tor tambroides), yellow mystus and transverse-bar barb.

See also
List of national parks of Thailand
List of Protected Areas Regional Offices of Thailand

References

National parks of Thailand
Geography of Kanchanaburi province
Tourist attractions in Kanchanaburi province
1981 establishments in Thailand
Protected areas established in 1981